Cylindroid may refer to:
Elliptic cylinder, a cylinder with an ellipse as its cross-section
An adjectival form of Cylinder (geometry), regardless of cross-section
Plücker's conoid, a self-intersecting ruled surface whose cross-sections are pairs of crossing lines